Ridge Canipe (born July 13, 1994) is an American actor. Ridge is best known for his roles in Walk the Line (in which he played  Johnny Cash as a boy), the thriller Baby Blues in 2008 and the 2005 version of Bad News Bears. He also co-starred in the 231st presentation of the Hallmark Hall of Fame production Pictures of Hollis Woods which aired on CBS in December 2007.  He helped Walk the Line castmate and friend Hailey Anne Nelson, write and issue a vegan cookbook for children by PETA.

He has also appeared in episodes of Desperate Housewives, as Danny Farrell, the paper boy of Wisteria Lane. Other appearances in television shows include guest roles in Angel, Cold Case, CSI and Drake & Josh. He has also appeared as young Dean Winchester in the CW TV series Supernatural.

Filmography

Television

External links

1994 births
Male actors from California
American male child actors
American male film actors
American male television actors
Living people
People from Laguna Beach, California